Lemi is a municipality of Finland. It is located in the South Karelia region.

The municipality is unilingually Finnish. The Finnish thrash metal band Stam1na is from Lemi.
In 2018 Lemi won the title heavy metal capital of the world that was determined by number of bands per capita.
Lemi had 13 recognised bands but due to Lemi only having just 3,076 inhabitants won with ratio of 422.6 bands per 100,000 inhabitants.

Geography
The municipal center of Lemi is Juvola. The other villages are Ahtiala, Hakulila, Heikkilä, Huttula, Hyvärilä, Iitiä, Juuresaho (prev. Remunen), Juvola, Kaamanniemi, Kuukanniemi, Kapiala, Keskisenpää, Korpela, Kurkela, Kärmeniemi, Laakkola, Lavola, Merenlahti, Metsola, Mikkola, Mikonharju, Nisola, Nuppola, Olkkonen, Parkkola, Pöllölä, Ruohiala, Ruomi, Sairala, Sorvarila, Suomalainen, Suoniala, Suontakainen, Sutela, Taipale, Tevaniemi, Torvenniemi, Tuomelanpelto (partly belongs to Iitiä), Uiminniemi, Urola, Vainikkala, Välikangas and Värtölä.

The schools are in Juvola and Kuukanniemi. There are about 750 inhabitants in Kuukanniemi and the villages it affects.

History

Independence
Lemi has been founded in 1688 as an independent Evangelic-Lutheran parish. Due to the secularisation of the local governments according to the decree of 1865, the secular local government was separated from the clerical in 1867 as the municipality of Lemi.

War time

Some fighting took place in the cemetery of Lemi during the civil war in 1918. After the winter war as the military hardware had to be displaced from the territories to be given to the Soviet Union on the basis of the Moscow Armistice, naval artillery was brought to Lemi to create part of the Salpa Line. From the Käkisalmi region the Vahtiniemi battery was transferred to Kärmeniemi consisting of two Canet 152/45-C naval guns. Later, on 11 July 1941, they were taken to Antamoinen to be tested on 22 July. Four days later they were transported by train from Lappeenranta again near Käkisalmi to Vahtiniemi to become operational 9 September 1941. After the Continuation War the 32nd heavy battery brought only one of the two Canet 152/45-C's it had as the other was to repaired. By the end of November 1944 the 32nd heavy battery was dissolved and the guns were sent to Parola.
 
After the war there has not been naval guns in Lemi, but the remaining positions can be seen both in Kärmeniemi and Juvola.

Attractions

Notable individuals 
 Elias Muukka, painter
 Mirja Hietamies, Olympic champion cross-country skier
 Stam1na, thrash metal band

References

External links

Municipality of Lemi – Official website
goSaimaa.com – travel information

Municipalities of South Karelia
Populated places established in 1688
1688 establishments in Sweden